Pöyrisjärvi Wilderness Area is a wilderness reserve in Enontekiö municipality, Lapland, Finland.

See also
 Wilderness areas of Finland
 Pöyrisjärvi

References

External links
 
 Pöyrisjärvi Wilderness Area at Outdoors.fi (Metsähallitus)

Protected areas established in 1991
1991 establishments in Finland
Enontekiö
Wilderness areas of Finland